Otter Brewery is a brewery in Luppitt, near Honiton, Devon, and named after the nearby River Otter. The brewery was founded in 1990 by David and Mary Ann McCaig and is still run by the family, who also run a pub owned by the company, the Holt in Honiton.  The company invests heavily in sustainability, with such innovations as a cellar built mostly underground to save the needs for refrigeration and the use of reed beds to recycle waste water.

Awards
Otter Brewery has won a number of awards, including The Good Pub Guide "Brewery of the Year" in 2013 as well as being named "Most Sustainable Brewery" at the 2011 Society of Independent Brewers awards.

Products
Otter produce five regular beers and two lagers, as well as speciality and seasonal ales.

Regular beers
 Otter Bitter (ABV 3.6%) - Green label / badge
 Otter Ale (ABV 4.5%) - Red label / badge
 Otter Amber (ABV 4.3%) - Orange badge (cask only)
 Otter Bright (ABV 4.0%) - Creme label / badge
 Otter Head (ABV 5.8%) - blue label / badge

Lager
 Tarka (ABV 4.8%)
 Four (ABV 4.0%)

Speciality and seasonal beers
Otter produce one standard winter beer which goes under a number of names, including Otter Witch (Halloween), Otter Claus (Christmas), MacOtter (Burns Night) and Otter Cupid (Valentine's Day).  The brewery says that "We firmly believe that one particularly good beer is better than a bucketful of seasonals".  It also produces a session beer named Beautiful Daze which is sold at Beautiful Days music festival at nearby Escot, where it runs the beer stalls, and a speciality Flaming Ale which is sold at the Tar Barrels event in Ottery St Mary.

References

Breweries in England
English brewers
British companies established in 1990
Food and drink companies established in 1990
1990 establishments in England